Prickly Pear Island is an islet approx. 650 metres off the north shore coast of Hodges Bay on the much larger island of Antigua, West Indies. The island measures approx. 50 metres north to south, and approx. 50 metres east to west. The small uninhabited island is home to the Prickly Pear Beach Club at Hodges Bay, a favorite day-time escape for the celebrity elite.

References 

Uninhabited islands of Antigua and Barbuda